Alice Grenfell or Alice Pyne (1842 – 8 August 1917) was a British suffrage organiser and honorary secretary of the Women's Progressive Society. In later life she became an expert on ancient Egyptian scarabs.

Life
Grenfell married John Granville Grenfell. Their son, Bernard, was born in Birmingham but he was brought up and educated at Clifton College in Bristol, where John taught.

Grenfell was active in the suffrage movement. She was in America in 1888 attending the inaugural meeting of the International Council of Women in Washington with Susan B. Anthony. She became the honorary secretary of the Women's Progressive Society.

Grenfell served on a school board for three years.

Grenfell went to live with her son after her husband died in 1897. Her son was a leading papyrologist working with Arthur Surridge Hunt. She took a great interest in her son's work and in particular Egyptian Scarab shaped artifacts. She taught herself to read hieroglyphics and  published her own papers including, The Iconography of Bes, and of Phoenician Bes-Hand Scarabs in 1902. She created a catalogue of the Grenfell family's and the scarab collection belonging to Queen's College. This collection had been left to the college by Dr Robert Mason but it had been gathered by the Italian explorer Giovanni Battista Belzoni.

In 1908, he became Professor of Papyrology at Oxford, however he was ill and she cared for him for four years. During that time the professorship lapsed. He had recovered by 1913. Grenfell died in Oxford in 1917.

Her son died on 18 May 1926, and was buried in Holywell Cemetery, Oxford.

Works include
 The Iconography of Bes, and of Phoenician Bes-Hand Scarabs, 1902
 The Grenfell Collection of Scarabs, 1916

References

1842 births
1917 deaths
British Egyptologists
British suffragists
20th-century non-fiction writers
20th-century British women writers